Otterville is the name of several places in the United States:

 Otterville, Illinois
 Otterville, Iowa
 Otterville, Missouri

Otterville is also a place in Canada:

 Otterville, Ontario